Fudbalski Klub Budućnost Podgorica (Cyrillic: Будућност Подгорица, lit. "Future") is a Montenegrin football club from Podgorica, Montenegro. It is competing in the Montenegrin First League. Its colours are blue and white.

Founded in 1925, Budućnost was the Montenegrin club with most appearances in the Yugoslav First League, debuting in 1946. Due to the city being renamed during the communist rule in Yugoslavia, Budućnost was known as Budućnost Titograd throughout that era. Since Montenegrin independence in 2006, the club has won five Montenegrin First League titles and three Montenegrin Cups. They are the Montenegrin club with the most games and seasons in European competitions, winning the UEFA Intertoto Cup in 1981.

The team produced many European top-class players among whom are the UEFA Champions League winning strikers Dejan Savićević and Predrag Mijatović. FK Budućnost is a part of Budućnost Podgorica sports society.

History

Period 1925–1941

The club was founded in June 1925, as a Workers' sports club Zora (RSK Zora). After two years, club was named as RSK Budućnost. Historically, the first ever team of RSK Zora / RSK Budućnost, in period between 1925 and 1928, played Musaja Čelebičić, Vaso Vukadinović, Bećo Abdomerović, Vaso Čarapić, Vlado Kirsanov, Đorđe Kešeljević, Vaso Kulić, Blažo Prelević, Duljo Džaferadžović, Blažo Šutulović, Buto Krkanović, Luka Bulatović, Tahir Čelebić, Ilija Ivanović, Milo Pajović, Milovan Radulović, Vuko Vuksanović, Dušan Krcunović, Đorđije Vučeljić, Branko Rajković, Smail Bibezić, Šećir Kapadžić and Arso Marković. The first coach was Slovenian-born Karlo Vugrinec, who served in Podgorica as an electrician.

The first game in the history of FK Budućnost was a friendly match against local rival GSK Balšić, played in 1925. Budućnost won the game, with result 2–1.

In the late 1920s, RSK Budućnost played their first games in official competitions. Their debut in Montenegrin football championship occurred in season 1927 (under the name Zora), when they were eliminated at the First stage of competition against GSK Balšić (0–3). Next season, Budućnost made their first win in official competitions, defeating GSK Balšić (2–1), but were eliminated in Championship semifinals against Lovćen (2–3).

In the next two years, Budućnost was eliminated in the early stages of Montenegrin Championship, and in spring 1931, for the second time in history, played in the semifinals. After elimination of GSK Balšić (4–1) and Berane (3–0), the team from Podgorica lost the semifinals against Obilić Nikšić (3–5).

In autumn 1931, Budućnost for the first time played in the finals of the Montenegrin football championship, but lost against SK Crnogorac Cetinje (1–2). In previous stages of competition, Budućnost eliminated GSK Balšić (6–2) and Gorštak Kolašin (3–1).

The Podgorica side played their first international game in 1932. Budućnost was hosted by KS Vllaznia in Shkoder and won 1–0.

In autumn 1932, Budućnost won their first title of Montenegrin champion. In the finals, the team from Podgorica defeated FK Lovćen (6–3). During that season, FK Budućnost played their first official game against FK Sutjeska (2–1) and that was the first edition of Montenegrin Derby—the greatest rivalry in the history of Montenegrin football. In spring 1933, Budućnost defended the trophy—their opponent in the final game were, again, FK Lovćen (2–0; 2–2). FK Budućnost won their third Montenegrin championship in 1934. Their opponent in the finals, was FK Lovćen (2–0, 1–1). The last time Budućnost played in a Championship final was in 1935; in that year FK Lovćen won the title (1–2).

At the beginning of 1937, as a team which supported workers' ideas, together with FK Lovćen, FK Budućnost was abandoned by the regime of that time. During the next years, the club, under the temporary name RSK Crna Gora, only played a few friendly, illegal games, against Lovćen and FK Velež from Mostar.

With the beginning of World War II, all sports' activities of the club were suspended. All the players joined the Partisan movement and 19 died during the battles. Outside of Podgorica City Stadium (Western stand), there is a memorial tablet commemorating all FK Budućnost players who died or participated in the war.

Period 1945–1975
After the war, the club was refounded under the name FK Budućnost. Their first game was played on 1 May 1945, against FK Lovćen at Cetinje (4–2). In January 1946, Budućnost played its first international friendly game after the war—against KF Tirana (6–1) in Podgorica. Soon after that, the team from Podgorica won the first official football competition after World War II—in the Montenegrin Republic League for the 1946 season, which meant placement in the inaugural season of the Yugoslav First League (1946–47). During the six matches, Budućnost hadn't a single defeat and made one of the biggest official victories in the team's history—against Arsenal (8–0).

The historical first game in First Yugoslav League, FK Budućnost played on 25 August 1946 against Dinamo Zagreb (2–2), in front of 5,000 spectators in Podgorica, which was equal with town population of that time. On 16 March 1947, Budućnost defeated NK Nafta 9–0. Until today, it remains the biggest home victory of Budućnost in the First League.

Until 1955, FK Budućnost played three seasons in Yugoslav First League, four in Yugoslav Second League and three in Montenegrin Republic League. For all that time, their head coach was Vojin Božović, who still holds two records in the club's history—manager with most seasons (10) and with the most official games (199). In the season 1953, FK Budućnost made the biggest victory in official games history, against Iskra away (13–1).

From 1955 to 1960, team from Podgorica was a permanent participant of Yugoslav First League. Their best performance of that era occurred in 1956–57 and 1958–59, finishing as a ninth-placed team.

The most important moment in the next decade occurred in season 1964–65. Budućnost was a member of Yugoslav Second League, but they surprisingly participated in the final game of 1964–65 Yugoslav Cup. They lost a game against Dinamo Zagreb (1–2). In their first Cup final, Budućnost played with following team: Hajduković, Folić, Gardašević, Pavlović, Savković, Kovačević, Šaković, Todorović, Šorban, Ćerić, Franović (coach: Božidar Dedović). The only goal for Budućnost scored Franović in the 35th minute. In previous rounds, FK Budućnost eliminated Sutjeska (3–2), Radnički Beograd (1–0), OFK Beograd (3–2) and Vardar away (2–0) in semifinals.

Of the other side, during the 1960s, FK Budućnost spent only one season in the top tier (1962–63).

From 1969 to 1974, FK Budućnost was among the best Yugoslav Second League sides, as they were title holders three times and twice runners-up. But, in all five seasons, they failed to gain a promotion to Yugoslav First League via playoffs. Rows of playoff losses started in 1969 against Sloboda Tuzla (0–3, 1–1), and continued in 1970 against Sloga Kraljevo (2–0, 0–2; lost on penalties), 1971 against Vardar Skopje (1–1, 0–3), 1972 against Spartak Subotica (1–0, 1–2; lost on penalties) and in 1973 against Maribor (1–0, 0–1; lost on penalties).

Finally, in season 1974–75, Budućnost gained their first promotion to top flight after 12 years. They won the Second League title with 14 points more than second-place Sutjeska and prepared for their comeback to the Yugoslav First League.

Period 1975–1992
The period known as a golden era of football in Podgorica is 1975–1985. Budućnost was a permanent top-tier member, finishing two seasons as six-placed team.

A big comeback of FK Budućnost to Yugoslav First League occurred in season 1975–76. Budućnost avoided a relegation and during the season few attendance records were made. The third week game between Budućnost and Hajduk Split (1–2) was attended by 20,000 spectators, which is the highest number in the history of Budućnost home games, but the Podgorica City Stadium, too. Otherwise, 1975–76 First League games in Podgorica averaged 12,765 supporters, which is another all-time record.

In season 1976–77, FK Budućnost had another performance in the Yugoslav Cup final game. Their rival was Hajduk Split and the team from Podgorica again lost the trophy. This time, they were defeated in extra-time (0–2). In the final, Budućnost started out with the following team: Vujačić, Janković, Folić, J. Miročević, Vukčević, Milošević, Kovačević, Bošković, Radonjić, A. Miročević, Ljumović (coach: Marko Valok). In previous rounds, Budućnost eliminated Pobeda Prilep (3–1), Rudar Kakanj (1–0), Sarajevo (3–2) and Radnički Niš away in semifinals (1–1; Budućnost won the penalties). Two appearances in the Yugoslav Cup finals (1965, 1977) are considered as the greatest achievements of FK Budućnost in the era of SFR Yugoslavia.

At the same time, in spring 1977, Budućnost debuted in the Balkans Cup, finishing second in the group with Panathinaikos (1–2, 2–2) and Vllaznia (2–0, 1–1).

Seasons 1978–79 and 1980–81 were remembered as best performances of FK Budućnost in Yugoslav Second League. Both times, the team from Podgorica finished in sixth place. In season 1978–79, no one from the big four of Yugoslav football (Hajduk, FK Crvena Zvezda, GNK Dinamo and FK Partizan) won a game in Podgorica.

With sixth place in 1981, FK Budućnost qualified for Intertoto Cup. They had a successful campaign in international competition, finishing among nine group winners. In Group 4, Budućnost played against Odense (4–2, 1–1), Östers (3–1, 0–0) and Wacker Innsbruck (1–2, 3–1).

After the First League season 1981–82, all-time top-striker of FK Budućnost Mojaš Radonjić signed to their biggest rival Sutjeska. Radonjić played for Budućnost from 1972, with overall 84 scored goals, and among them 52 in the Yugoslav First League.

During the 80s, Budućnost never relegated from the First League, but another achievement of the Podgorica side was producing great players. So, in 1983 for FK Budućnost debuted Dejan Savićević, who would later win two UEFA Champions League titles, with one scored goal in the final. Savićević played for Budućnost from 1983 to 1988, including the 130 games in Yugoslav First League with 36 goals scored. For most matches in his career, Savićević played for Budućnost.

Another great talent of FK Budućnost, Predrag Mijatović, debuted in 1987 and would later win and score a goal in one UEFA Champions League final. Mijatović played two seasons in Budućnost senior team, with 73 appearances and 10 scored goals.

Other players who started their careers in FK Budućnost during the 80s were Branko Brnović (100 games / 13 goals for Budućnost in First League), Željko Petrović (59/6), Niša Saveljić (98/8), Dragoljub Brnović (183/12) and Dragoje Leković (133/0); they all were members of national teams SFR Yugoslavia and FR Yugoslavia.

In the period 1985 to 1991, FK Budućnost continued to play in Yugoslav First League. Their best finish at that time occurred in season 1986–87—the team from Podgorica was seventh-placed, equalised on table with GNK Dinamo Zagreb, and were only one point less than fourth-placed Rijeka.

The 80s were also remembered for the founding of organized Ultras group. Varvari (Barbarians) was founded in 1987. It was the strongest organised supporters group in Montenegro and among the well-known in former Yugoslav territories.

On 28 May 1989, FK Budućnost played their first game under the floodlights in Podgorica City Stadium, against Rad (3–0).

FK Budućnost made their third international performance in 1991. They represented Yugoslavia in the Balkans Cup. That was a very successful campaign for Budućnost, who played in the finals. In the quarterfinals, they eliminated KF Tirana (2–0, 0–0). FK Budućnost made a huge surprise in the semifinals, eliminating Galatasaray (0–0, 1–1). In the final, FK Budućnost lost to FC Inter Sibiu (0–0, 0–1).
From 1946 to 1992, FK Budućnost played 26 seasons in Yugoslav First League. With 261 wins and 188 draws from 789 games, they are among the top 14 teams on the all-time list of the Yugoslav football championship.

Period 1992–2006
After the breaking of SFR Yugoslavia, Montenegro stayed in federation with Serbia, in the successor state called FR Yugoslavia. So, FK Budućnost became a member of the new top-tier competition—the FR Yugoslavia First League.

Until the end of the 90s, First League had two groups (A and B) and FK Budućnost played the majority of seasons in the higher one.

FK Budućnost had its first success in the new football system in 1994–95. They finished as a champion of First B League and gained participation in international competitions. In the playoffs for UEFA competitions, Budućnost played against Vojvodina; the winner took the spot in the UEFA Cup and were defeated in the UEFA Intertoto Cup. While FK Budućnost won the first game in Podgorica (3–1), Vojvodina won 5–2 in Novi Sad, so Budućnost played in the 1995 UEFA Intertoto Cup. They finished fourth in Group 7, so didn't qualify for further stages. FK Budućnost won an away game against Tervis Pärnu (3–1), but were defeated by Bayer in Leverkusen. As Podgorica City Stadium didn't meet new UEFA rules, they played home games against Nea Salamis (1–1) and OFI Crete (3–4) in Belgrade.

At the beginning of 2000, FK Budućnost performances were weaker, so they were relegated after season 2000–01. Budućnost lost the battle against Rad, so they were moved to lower rank after the 26 consecutive seasons spent in top-tier.

Another surprise came during the next two seasons, when FK Budućnost failed to gain a quick promotion to First League. Finally, promotion came after the 2003–04 Second League edition, when FK Budućnost with a young, homegrown team, dominated in competition.

They made a great top-tier comeback in season 2004–05. Among many significant results, FK Budućnost defeated Crvena Zvezda in Belgrade (2–1) for the first time after 18 years. At the end of the season, Budućnost finished sixth and gained a place in the UEFA Intertoto Cup. In the first leg of 2005 UEFA Intertoto Cup, they eliminated Valletta (2–2, 5–0) and in the next stage their opponent were Spanish giants Deportivo La Coruña. The first game at Estadio Riazor finished 3–0 for the home side. But, in the second match, FK Budućnost held a 2–0 lead in front of 10,000 supporters. At the end, Deportivo finished 2–1 and went on to the next stage.

Period 2006–present
As a Montenegrin club with the best results during the period 1945–2006, Budućnost continued with even greater successes in the Montenegrin First League (Prva CFL), after independence (2006).
On inaugural season of Prva CFL, team from Podgorica competed with FK Zeta in the title race. Hard fight for the trophy lasted until the end of season, but the rivals won the title. A spring game between Budućnost and Zeta in Podgorica (1–0) was attended by 10,000 supporters, which is the biggest attendance in the history of Prva CFL.
On season 2007–08, Budućnost played in UEFA Cup against HNK Hajduk. First game, played in front 10,000 spectators in Podgorica, finished 1–1, and Croatian team won the second match (1–0).
Next year, Budućnost won their first champions' title in clubs' history. They finished season with equal number of points as FK Zeta and FK Mogren, but with better score against that squads. Except that, on season 2007–08, team from Podgorica made an impressive row of 21 games without defeat. During the same season, Budućnost almost won the double, but in the finals of 2007–08 Montenegrin Cup, they were defeated after the penalties against FK Mogren (1–1 / 5–6). As a Montenegrin champion, for the first time in history, Budućnost played in UEFA Champions League qualifiers. But, their debut wasn't successful, as Budućnost was eliminated by Tampere United (1–1; 1–2).
From 2008 to 2011, Budućnost finished every single season in Prva CFL as runner-up, while they had another performance in the Cup finals on season 2009–10. Once again, they missed opportunity to win the trophy, and this time Budućnost was defeated by FK Rudar (1–2).
In that period, Budućnost played another three seasons in UEFA Europa League and most successful was their performance from season 2010–11, when they played in third qualifying leg, but defeated against Brøndby (1–2; 0–1).
Next success Budućnost made on season 2011–12, when they became a winner of Prva CFL. That was the second title of national champion for Budućnost. During all season long, they were in a hard struggle for title with FK Rudar. At the end, Podgorica's side won the title with three points more than their opponent. With 80 points from 33 games, 82 scored goals and 25 victories, Budućnost made a new all-time records of Prva CFL. 
Podgorica side was close to the third qualifying round of 2012–13 UEFA Champions League, but they didn't succeed, despite their away win against Śląsk Wrocław (0–2; 1–0).
A year later, team from Podgorica won the first Cup trophy in the history. In the finals of 2012–13 Montenegrin Cup, Budućnost defeated FK Čelik 1–0. A game with lot of violence at Podgorica City Stadium was solved in the last minute, as Mitar Peković scored a goal for a trophy. That was the fifth performance of Budućnost in national cup finals and their very first victory.
As a Cup winner, Budućnost played in 2014–15 UEFA Europa League. On first stage, they eliminated Folgore (3–0; 2–1), but their season ended against Omonia (0–2; 0–0).
Next three seasons, Budućnost spent in unsuccessful runs for the trophies. But, in European competitions, they almost made a big success in 2016–17 UEFA Europa League. In first leg, Budućnost eliminated Rabotnički (1–0; 1–1). On next stage, their rival was Genk. First match, played in Belgium, finished with 2–0 hosts victory. Next week in Podgorica, Budućnost succeed to annul the opponents advantage and won 2–0. But, the Belgium side qualified for the next round after the penalties (2–4). Game against Genk in Podgorica was remembered as one of the best European performances of Budućnost of the decade.
Finally, on season 2016–17 team from the capital won their third title of national champion. That was a hard struggle with FK Zeta and OFK Titograd and Budućnost finished at the first position thanks to a better results against their direct opponents. All three teams earned 57 points during the season.
In the 2017–18 UEFA Champions League, Budućnost met Partizan and eliminated after the lost game in Belgrade (0–0; 0–2).
Next trophy, team from Podgorica won in Montenegrin Cup 2018–19. Led by manager Branko Brnović, Budućnost defeated FK Lovćen in the finals, with result 4–0. Except that, striker Mihailo Perović became a very first player which scored three goals in the Cup finals. During the summer 2019, after two years without success, Budućnost finally passed the first stage in European competitions. In Europa League, they eliminated Estonian-side Narva Trans (4–1; 2–0), but stopped in second leg against Zorya Luhansk from Ukraine (1–3; 0–1).
Fourth title in the history, Budućnost won on season 2019–20. During the season, head coach Brnović was sacked, new manager became Mladen Milinković and, after the domination, team from Podgorica secured the title six weeks before the end of season. Bad news came after 31st week of Prva CFL, as few Budućnost players were infected by COVID-19. Because of that, championship was interrupted.
Season 2020-21 with Mladen Milinković as head coach was historical for Budućnost in many ways. During the summer, they made significant result in 2020–21 UEFA Europa League, after the victory against FC Astana away (1-0), but failed to qualify to playoffs, after the defeat against FK Sarajevo (1-2). In the rest of the season, for the first time in club's history, Budućnost won the double. In 2020–21 Montenegrin First League, Budućnost finished first with many all-time Montenegrin records as biggest number of earned points (85), highest number of wins (27) and the longest unbeaten run (23 games). They equalised their record of 10 consecutive victories in the championship from the season 2011-12. That was the first time when Budućnost defended the national title won on previous season. On the other side, with 3-1 victory in the finals against Dečić, Budućnost won another trophy in Montenegrin Cup.

Evolution of name
FK Budućnost has played under three different names.

List of competitive matches (1925–)
Below is an overall score of all matches of FK Budućnost in official competitions since 1925. More details at page List of FK Budućnost seasons.

Note: Including 2019–20 UEFA Europa League, 2020–21 Montenegrin First League and 2020-21 Montenegrin Cup results

Records

Biggest home victory: Budućnost – Rabotnički 10:0 (16 May 1948, Yugoslav Second League)
Biggest home defeat: Budućnost – Hajduk Split 0:5 (15 December 1946, Yugoslav First League)
Biggest away victory: Iskra Danilovgrad – Budućnost 1:13 (10 May 1953, Montenegrin Republic League)
Biggest away defeat: Partizan – Budućnost 10:0 (29 October 1950, Yugoslav First League)
Biggest First league victory: Budućnost – Nafta 9:0 (16 March 1947, Yugoslav First League)
Biggest European victory:  Valletta – Budućnost 0:5 (18 June 2005)
Biggest European defeat:  Budućnost –  HJK Helsinki 0:4 (13 July 2021),  HB – Budućnost 4:0 (22 July 2021)
Biggest home attendance: 20,000, Budućnost – Hajduk Split (27 August 1975, Yugoslav First League)
Biggest away attendance: 60,000, Dinamo Zagreb – Budućnost (2 May 1982, Yugoslav First League)

Budućnost in European competitions

FK Budućnost is the Montenegrin club with most played seasons and matches in European football competitions. Except for participation in UEFA competitions, Budućnost played twice in the Balkans Cup.

UEFA competitions

FK Budućnost debuted in European competitions in 1981, when they played in Intertoto Cup, finishing as a first place team in the group. In the following decades, Budućnost played in the same competition twice, with notable victory against Deportivo La Coruña (2:1) in 2006.

After Montenegrin independence, Budućnost became a regular participant in UEFA competitions, and played three seasons in the Champions League qualifiers. More recently, Budućnost's most successful European season was 2016/17 in UEFA Europa League. After eliminating the Macedonian side Rabotnički, Budućnost almost won against K.R.C. Genk (2:0 in Podgorica after 0:2 in Genk in first match), but lost on penalties.

Balkans Cup

FK Budućnost played two seasons in the Balkans Cup, a regional competition for clubs from Yugoslavia, Albania, Bulgaria, Greece, Romania and Turkey. The club made its debut in 1977 in Group B, with Panathinaikos and Vllaznia. After four legs, they were second in the group with four points. During their second spell in the Balkans Cup, in 1991, Budućnost reached the final losing to FC Inter Sibiu. Before the final game, Budućnost eliminated Galatasaray.

Honours and achievements

National Championships – 5
Montenegrin First League:
 Winners (5): 2007–08, 2011–12, 2016–17, 2019–20, 2020–21
 Runners-up (9): 2006–07, 2008–09, 2009–10, 2010–11, 2012–13, 2015–16, 2017–18, 2018–19, 2021–22
National Cups – 4
Montenegrin Cup:
 Winners (4): 2012–13, 2018–19, 2020–21, 2021–22
 Runners-up (3): 2007–08, 2009–10, 2015–16
Yugoslav Cup:
 Runners-up (2): 1964–65, 1976–77
Championships (1922–1940) – 4
Montenegrin Championship (1922–1940)
 Winners (4): 1932, spring 1933, autumn 1933, 1934
 Runners-up (2): 1931, 1935
International – 1
Intertoto Cup
 Group winners (1): 1981
Balkans Cup:
 Runners-up (1): 1990–91

Supporters and rivalries

Varvari
	
	
Budućnost fans are known as Varvari (Barbarians), a group founded in 1987. The group's traditional colours are blue and white, which are also the colours of all the Budućnost sports clubs. For FK Budućnost Podgorica home games, Varvari occupy the northern stand (Śever) of the Podgorica city stadium. They also have a reserved stand at the Morača Sports Center, as supporters of KK Budućnost basketball club.
The focal point for the group during the late 1990s was the basketball club, which started investing heavily while the football club toiled in the lower half of the table.

Since its foundation years, Varvari gained a reputation of a violent group, and in the recent history they caused some of the biggest accidents that occurred at football matches. At First League 2004–05 game Budućnost – Partizan Belgrade, flares, blocks, construction materials and similar objects were thrown from the North stand to the pitch and the match was abandoned for 15 minutes. The following year, the home game against Red Star Belgrade was suspended for two hours after home supporters (Varvari) sprayed tear gas on the pitch and, after that, attacked visitors' ultras. In spring 2006, there was crowd violence at the local rivals game Budućnost – Zeta. In the Montenegrin First League, numerous matches of FK Budućnost were suspended due to crowd violence or crowd invasion of the pitch. During the latest seasons, there has been an escalation of violence at the Montenegrin Derby games.

They have the best organised and largest fan group in Montenegro. According to many fan magazines from the Balkans they are the only fans in Montenegro who are at the level of the largest ex-Yugoslavian fan groups.

Rivalries

FK Budućnost participated in the biggest game in Montenegrin football—the Montenegrin Derby, a match against FK Sutjeska from Nikšić. The first official game was played 9 October 1932. As a match of main and strongest clubs from two biggest Montenegrin cities, The Derby became popular from its earliest days. Some of the highest attendance in Montenegrin football were recorded at the games of the Montenegrin Derby. Since the 80s, both clubs have organised groups of supporters, which gave to the Montenegrin Derby a new and often violent dimension.

Except Montenegrin Derby, in period 1925–1935, there was a big local derby in Podgorica, between FK Budućnost and GSK Balšić. As Budućnost was officially workers' club and Balšić the team of that-time regime, Podgorica derby had big social dimension. Together with Cetinje teams Lovćen and Crnogorac, rivals from Podgorica were among the top four teams in Montenegrin Football Championship (1922–1940). So, their games made huge interest in Podgorica and nearby places. Two teams played first game at 1925 and Budućnost won 2–1 (friendly game).

During the regime of Kingdom of Yugoslavia, work of RSK Budućnost is prohibited at 1937. After the Second World War, GSK Balšić was not refounded, so derby was alive only in period from 1925 to 1936. Budućnost won four champion titles in period 1925–1935, while GSK Balšić won seven trophies in seasons between 1925 and 1940. Budućnost and Balšić played 11 official games. Budućnost won 8 matches and Balšić 3 games, with goal difference 22–12 (Budućnost goals first).

During the period 1946–2006, especially popular were games of FK Budućnost against the bigfour of Yugoslav football (Crvena zvezda, Dinamo Zagreb, Hajduk Split and Partizan). Games against Hajduk and Dinamo, FK Budućnost played in Yugoslav First League until the breakup of SFR Yugoslavia, and against Crvena zvezda and Partizan until Montenegrin independence.

Stadium and training facility

Podgorica City Stadium

	
FK Budućnost plays its home games at the Stadion Pod Goricom, in Podgorica. Stadion Pod Goricom, is also the largest football stadium in Montenegro and the home ground of the Montenegro national football team. The stadium's original capacity was about 12,000 spectators, which expanded to 15,230 with the addition of the north and south stands. An eastern stand is planned to be built soon, which will bring the stadium's capacity to over 20,000.

The pitch measures 105 x 70 meters. Stadium is well known for close distance between pitch and stands. Pitch is totally renovated in 2014 and today is among the best football pitches in the Balkans.

Floodlights were installen at the 1989, with the first match in the night-time Budućnost – Rad (First League, 28 May 1989). Twenty years later, new, 1900 lux, floodlights were installen.

FK Budućnost training center

Since 2008, FK Budućnost made their own training center in Camp FSCG, located on Ćemovsko polje, a plain on the Podgorica outskirts between the settlements Stari Aerodrom and Konik.

At their training center, an area of 18,000 sq meters, FK Budućnost owns an administrative building with offices, meeting rooms, press room and technical facilities, and two football grounds. Both pitches have stands with capacity of 1,000 seats. On these home grounds, all young teams of FK Budućnost and ŽFK Budućnost also play.

In November 2016, the senior team of FK Budućnost played an official game at the training centre for the first time. In the Montenegrin Cup match, they hosted FK Kom.

Current team

Squad

Coaching staff

Coaching and players history

Records
Most performances:  Slavko Vlahović – 413/1 (1977–1991)
Most performances in First League:  Slavko Vlahović – 392 (1977–1991)
Top goalscorer:  Mojaš Radonjić – 84 (1972–1982)
Top goalscorer in First League:  Mojaš Radonjić – 52 (1975–1982)
Head coach with most seasons:  Vojin Božović – 199 games (1945–1955)

Notable players
See :Category:FK Budućnost Podgorica players.

During its history, many notable players started their career or played for FK Budućnost. Most notable are Podgorica-born players Dejan Savićević, Predrag Mijatović, Branko Brnović, Željko Petrović, Niša Saveljić and Dragoljub Brnović. Players with most games for Budućnost are Ibrahim Methadžović and Slavko Vlahović. Most goals for FK Budućnost scored in the First League was by Mojaš Radonjić.

Below is the list of players who, during their career, played for FK Budućnost and represented their countries in national teams.

 Dejan Savićević
 Predrag Mijatović
 Milutin Pajević
 Ante Miročević
 Branko Brnović
 Željko Petrović
 Dragoje Leković
 Dragoljub Brnović
 Niša Saveljić
 Lazar Radović
 Nikola Jovanović
 Nikola Radović
 Miljan Zeković
 Slavko Vlahović
 Jovan Hajduković
 Branko Rašović
 Vojin Božović
 Jovan Hajduković
 Ibrahim Methadžović
 Miodrag Božović
 Željko Janović
 Anto Drobnjak
 Mojaš Radonjić
 Zvezdan Pejović
 Srđan Radonjić
 Damir Čakar
 Vojo Ćalov
 Ardian Đokaj
 Goran Perišić
 Zlatko Kostić
 Mirko Raičević
 Vojo Gardašević
 Žarko Vukčević
 Zoran Batrović
 Goran Trobok
 Fatos Bećiraj
 Dejan Vukićević
 Dejan Ognjanović
 Igor Burzanović
 Aleksandar Nedović
 Saša Petrović
 Zoran Vorotović
 Sanibal Orahovac
 Zlatko Dalić
 Rade Zalad
 Ljubiša Spajić
 Živan Ljukovčan
 Dragan Simeunović
 Rahim Beširović
 Dodë Tahiri
 Zamir Shpuza
 Sahmir Garčević
 Bojan Magazin
 Viktor Trenevski
 Mikhail Markhel
 Gustavo Fabián López
 Maximiliano Vallejo
 Flávio
 Giuliano
 Misdongarde Betolngar
 Abraham Kumedor
 Daniel Wansi

Historical list of coaches

 Karlo Vugrinec (1925–28)
 Duljo Vlak (1928–31)
 Šefket Šabanadžović (1932–34)
 Vojin Božović (1945–55)
 Božidar Dedović (1964–66)
 Vasilije Darmanović (1966–67)
 Aleksandar Atanacković (1967–68)
 Dušan Nenković (1972–73)
 Dušan Varagić (1975–76)
 Marko Valok (1976–77)
 Dragoljub Milošević (1977–78)
 Đorđe Gerum (1982–83)
 Milutin Folić (1983)
 Petar Š. Ljumović (1984)
 Milutin Folić (1984)
 Josip Duvančić (1984–85)
 Srboljub Markušević (1985–86)
 Milan Živadinović (1986–87)
 Stanko Poklepović (1987–89)
 Mojaš Radonjić (1989–90)
 Josip Kuže (1990)
 Gano Ćerić (1990)
 Milovan Đorić (1991)
 Milan Živadinović (1991–92)
 Dimitrije Mitrović (1992–94)
 Slobodan Kustudić (1994)
 Dragan Šaković (1995)
 Dimitrije Mitrović (1995)
 Momčilo Vujačić (1996-1997)
 Savo Rogošić (1997)
 Mojaš Radonjić (1997)
 Dimitrije Mitrović (1997–1998)
 Petar C. Ljumović (1999)
 Dragan Okuka (1999)
 Janko Miročević (2000)
 Bozidar Vuković (2000)
 Dragan Šaković (2000)
 Miodrag Stanišić (2001)
 Nikola Rakojević (2001)
 Janko Miročević (2001–02)
 Mojaš Radonjić (Jul – Dec 2002)
 Srđan Bajić (Jan – Jun 2003)
 Branislav Milačić (Jul 2003– Mar 2006)
 Bozidar Vuković (Mar 2006 - Jun 2006)
 Miodrag Božović (Jul – Dec 2006)
 Branislav Milačić (Jan – Apr 2007)
 Bozidar Vuković (5 Apr 2007 - Jun 2007)
 Saša Petrović (Jun – Oct 2007)
 Mojaš Radonjić (28 Oct 2007 - Nov 2007) 
 Branko Babić (21 Nov 2007 – Sep 2008)
 Miodrag Ješić (3 Sep 2008 – May 2009)
 Mihailo Ivanović (Jun 2009 – Apr 2010)
 Nenad Vukčević (2 Apr 2010 - Jun 2010)
 Nikola Rakojević (Jun – Dec 2010)
 Saša Petrović (15 Dec 2010 – Jul 2011)
 Miodrag Radulović (Jul 2011 – Jun 2012)
 Radislav Dragićević (Jun 2012 – Jul 2013)
 Nenad Vukčević (Jul 2013 – Mar 2014)
 Goran Perisić (2 Apr 2014 – Jul 2014)
 Dragan Radojičić (30 Jul 2014 – Jun 2015)
 Miodrag Vukotić (Jun 2015 – Jun 2017)
 Dragan Kažić (Jun – Nov 2017)
 Vladimir Vermezović (Dec 2017 – May 2018)
 Zoran Govedarica (Jun – Sep 2018)
 Branko Brnović (Oct 2018 – Oct 2019)
 Mladen Milinković (Nov 2019 – July 2021)
 Aleksandar Nedović (Aug 2021 – Aug 2022)
 Miodrag Džudović (Aug 2022 – Current)

Sponsors
Official sponsor – (2020–) Savana 
Other main sponsors – City of Podgorica
Official kit supplier – (2020–) Adidas

Kit suppliers

Women's team

The women's team of FK Budućnost (ŽFK Budućnost) was formed in 2005. Until 2016, the team was known as ŽFK Palma.

It plays in the Montenegrin Women's League. It is the oldest women's football club in Montenegro. They won two champion titles—in seasons 2008–09 and 2009–10.

See also
List of FK Budućnost seasons
ŽFK Budućnost Podgorica
SD Budućnost Podgorica
Montenegrin Derby
Montenegrin First League
Montenegrin clubs in Yugoslav football competitions (1946–2006)
Podgorica City Stadium
Camp FSCG
Podgorica

References

External links

Official website
Official supporters' website
UEFA Profile
Soccerway profile

 
Association football clubs established in 1925
Buducnost Podgorica
Buducnost Podgorica
Buducnost Podgorica
1925 establishments in Montenegro